Milesia reinwardtii is a species of hoverfly in the family Syrphidae.

Distribution
Borneo, Java, Philippines.

References

Insects described in 1824
Eristalinae
Diptera of Asia
Taxa named by Christian Rudolph Wilhelm Wiedemann